Foreign language anxiety, also known as xenoglossophobia, is the feeling of unease, worry, nervousness and apprehension experienced in learning or using a second or foreign language. The feelings may stem from any second language context whether it is associated with the productive skills of speaking and writing or the receptive skills of reading and listening.

Research has shown that foreign language anxiety is a significant problem in language classrooms throughout the world especially in terms of its strong relationship to the skill of speaking in a foreign or second language.

Foreign language anxiety is a form of what psychologists describe as a specific anxiety reaction. Some individuals are more predisposed to anxiety than others and may feel anxious in a wide variety of situations. Foreign language anxiety, however, is situation-specific and so it can also affect individuals who are not characteristically anxious in other situations.

The main causes of foreign language anxiety are communication-apprehension, test anxiety, and fear of negative evaluation. There is also a psychological component to foreign language anxiety.

Foreign language anxiety has a variety of detrimental effects on foreign language performance, but both the student and the teacher can adopt strategies to minimize the anxiety.

Causes
Although all aspects of using and learning a foreign language can cause anxiety, both listening and speaking are regularly cited as the most anxiety provoking of foreign language activities. Foreign language anxiety is usually studied and seen in a language classroom environment, as this is where many students start learning a new language a fear of embarrassment.

General theories of anxiety can help explain the root of foreign language anxiety. The following theories of anxiety play a role in describing foreign language anxiety:

 Self-efficacy and appraisal: An anxiety reaction first depends on the individual's appraisal of how threatening a situation is. In the case of a perceived threatening situation, the amount of anxiety then depends on the individual's perception of their self-efficacy, or their confidence in their ability to effectively control the situation. Potential negative events that individuals do not believe they are equipped to handle often lead to anxiety. In terms of foreign language learning, appraisals of foreign language situations are seen as threatening with self-deprecating thoughts about an individual's language ability, which decreases their self-efficacy leading to foreign language anxiety:
 State, trait, and situational anxiety: Anxiety can be classified into trait anxiety, state anxiety, and the more recent distinction of situation-specific anxiety. Individuals with trait anxiety have chronic, persisting anxiety in all situations, whereas individuals with state anxiety are only anxious in particular situations. When applied to learning a language, this theory results in the additional distinction of situation-specific anxiety, which builds on state anxiety to describe a particular situation that induces anxiety only when specific conditions (e.g. a foreign language) are at play.

An example of when foreign language anxiety may occur would be in a classroom. The causes of foreign language anxiety have been broadly separated into three main components: communication apprehension, test anxiety and fear of negative evaluation. Communication apprehension is the anxiety experienced when speaking or listening to other individuals. Test-anxiety is a form of performance anxiety, that is associated with the fear of doing badly or failing altogether. Fear of negative evaluation is the anxiety associated with the learner's perception of how other onlookers (instructors, classmates or others) may negatively view their language ability. These three factors cause an increase of an individual's anxiety levels as well as a decrease in self-efficacy. In addition, specifically in an ESL classroom, students learning a foreign language out of their country are very vulnerable to high levels of anxiety pertaining to language learning. For they perceive more social distance between themselves and the native individuals of the target language, which as a result may cause them to experience a language shock.

Sparks and Ganschow draw attention to the fact that anxiety could result in or cause poor language learning. If a student is unable to study before a language examination, the student could experience test anxiety. Context anxiety could be viewed as a result. In contrast, anxiety becomes a cause of poor language learning, leading that student to then be unable to adequately learn the target language.

There can be various physical causes of anxiety, such as hormone levels, but the underlying causes of excessive anxiety while learning are fear and a lack of confidence.

There is a psychological component to foreign language anxiety as well; language learning is a "profoundly unsettling psychological proposition" as it jeopardizes an individual's self-understanding and perspective. It stems from one's self-perceptions of language ability. Foreign language anxiety is rooted in three psychological challenges:

 performance difficulty
 threat to one's image
 identity conflict

Those psychological states thus have task-performance and identity dimensions. People tend to act or speak in a way that would be judged appropriate to the other people native to the foreign culture, but the behavior that individuals are producing grapples with ingrained values and behaviors. Emotions by the psychological challenges has something to do with attempting to switch codes in an interactive encounter.

Effects
The effects of foreign language anxiety are particularly evident in the foreign language classroom, and anxiety is a strong indicator of academic performance. Anxiety is found to have a detrimental effect on students' confidence, self-esteem and level of participation.

Anxious learners suffer detrimental effects during spontaneous speaking activities in performance, affective reactions and their overall attitudes towards learning their target second language. Furthermore, they may lack confidence, be less able to self-edit and identify language errors and more likely to employ avoidance strategies such as skipping class. Anxious students also forget previously learned material, volunteer less and tend to be more passive in classroom activities than their less anxious classmates.

The effects of foreign language anxiety also extend outside the second language classroom. A high level of foreign language anxiety may also correspond with communication apprehension, causing individuals to be quieter and less willing to communicate. People who exhibit this kind of communication reticence can also sometimes be perceived as less trustworthy, less competent, less socially and physically attractive, tenser, less composed and less dominant than their less reticent counterparts.

Cross-cultural code-switching 
The effects of these negative emotions may also lead to cross-cultural code-switching, in which bilingual people alter a language to their other language in interactions with other bilinguals to feel more confident with the way they speak . Unlike linguistic code-switching, cross-cultural code-switching is the socio-linguistic phenomenon of changing culturally-ingrained behaviors in a foreign situation. Although cross-cultural code-switching possibly results from both positive and negative emotions, negative emotions are more common and more likely to affect the way a bilingual person speaks. Negative emotions include embarrassment, performance anxiety, guilt, distress and anxiety in general. "Molinsky identifies three psychological states that appraise under the influence of emotions while code-switching. These are: "experienced performance difficulty, face threat and identity conflict—all of which mediate the relationship between personal and contextual variables and the negative and positive emotions an individual experiences while code-switching".

There are three types of cross-cultural code-switching:
 situational code-switching
 conversational code-switching
 borrowing
This code-switching could be considered as an unconscious behavior because of its negative and usually threatening situations. In that sense, although code-switching results from foreign language anxiety, it is more often caused by external circumstances than by internal mental change.

Measures
A number of tools have been developed to investigate the level of foreign language anxiety experienced by language learners.

The Foreign Language Classroom Anxiety Scale (FLCAS) is a 33-question, 5-point Likert scale survey, which is widely used in research studies. It investigates participants' communication apprehension, test-anxiety and fear of negative evaluation and focuses on speaking in a classroom context. It has been translated and used in several languages, including Spanish and Chinese.

Following the success of the Foreign Language Classroom Anxiety scale, similar instruments have been devised for measuring Foreign Language Reading Anxiety (FLRAS), Foreign Language Listening Anxiety (FLLAS) and Second Language Writing Apprehension (SLWAT).

Reduction and management 
The reduction of foreign language anxiety necessitates the involvement of both the student and the teacher, each of which are able to adopt strategies to mitigate anxiety.

Students play an active role in acknowledging and managing their foreign language anxiety. The first step of recognizing and acknowledging the anxiety is needed in order to communicate their needs with their teacher and more effectively reach a strategy for reducing their anxiety. Specifically recognizing what types of foreign language activities induce their anxiety and what their personal language style is also helps as a first step in controlling the anxiety. From there, the student can seek help and support. Recommended personal strategies for reducing foreign language anxiety include joining language clubs, journal writing, positive self-talk, and in general taking advantage of any opportunities to use the language. Support groups can also be a useful tool, as well as other forms of collaboration among peers at a similar level of experience with the language.

Teachers can also adopt strategies and teaching methods that can help prevent foreign language anxiety to their students. Teaching-based strategies for reducing foreign language anxiety involve fostering a comfortable and relaxed classroom environment in which the teacher is supportive and friendly. Focusing on positive reinforcement and normalizing mistakes rather than focusing on the negative errors can help create an ideal classroom environment. For instance, teachers can adopt a "modeling approach" in which, instead of explicitly correcting errors in front of everyone in the class, the teacher repeats the utterance back to the student, but with the errors fixed. Specific strategies that teachers can use in the classroom include playing language games, conducting grammar language in the native language instead of the target language, leading group activities, and facilitating discussions of anxiety. This would allow students to document and recognize their own anxiety as well as understand that other students may feel the same way. Offering additional help outside of class can also be helpful.

One study recommends teaching songs in the classroom as a specific methodological strategy that can improve academic performance, which in turn decreases the anxiety level of students as they become more comfortable and proficient in the language. The study found that this tool is most beneficial to those with high anxiety.

Issues and area of research 
In the 1990s, the challenge was a clear categorization of grammatical or sociolinguistic constraints on code-switching caused by foreign language anxiety and to determine how bilinguals produce different code-mixed patterns. Previously, most researches focused more upon syntactic aspects on code-switching; in other words, psychological elements were completely ignored.

See also

References

Language education
Educational psychology
Anxiety
Complex (psychology)